Speak My Mind may refer to:

 "Speak My Mind", a song by Drake Bell from A Reminder (2011)
 Speak My Mind, a 2018 album by The Willis Clan, as well as the title track